Oliver H. Prince (1787–1837) was a U.S. Senator from Georgia from 1828 to 1829. Senator Prince may also refer to:

Charles H. Prince (1837–1912), Maine State Senate
Frederick O. Prince (1818–1899), Massachusetts State Senate
Job Prince (1795–1875), Maine State Senate
John Dyneley Prince (1868–1945), New Jersey State Senate
L. Bradford Prince (1840–1922), New York State Senate
Noah Prince (1797–1872), Maine State Senate
William Prince (politician) (1772–1824), Indiana State Senate